Parmanuiyeh (also Romanized as Parmanū’īyeh; also known as Parmanū) is a village in Howmeh Rural District, in the Central District of Bam County, Kerman Province, Iran. At the 2006 census, its population was 66, in 20 families.

References 

Populated places in Bam County